Madhukar Hiralal Kania (18 November 1927 – 1 February 2016) was an Indian judge who became the 23rd Chief Justice of India, serving from 13 December 1991 until his retirement on 17 November 1992. He was born in Bombay. His uncle was Sir Harilal Jekisundas Kania, the first Chief Justice of India. 

Kania was educated at Fellowship School, St. Xavier's High School, Elphinstone College and the Government Law College, Mumbai. He enrolled as an Advocate on 1 November 1949 at Bombay High Court. He practiced mainly in civil suits and commercial matters in the High Court and the Bombay City Civil Court, Bombay. He also appeared for the state of Maharashtra in civil suits in the Bombay City Civil Court. He was Assistant Government Pleader for the State of Maharashtra in the Bombay City Civil Court from 5 December 1964 to 15 January 1967. He was government pleader for the State of Maharashtra in the Bombay City Civil Court from 16 January 1967 to 3 November 1969. He was appointed Additional Judge of the Bombay High Court with effect from 14 November 1969. He was appointed a permanent Judge of Bombay High Court on 2 November 1971. In June 1986 he was appointed Chief Justice of the Bombay High Court. In May 1987, he was appointed a Judge of the Supreme Court of India, and became the Chief Justice of India in December 1991.

External links
 Brief biography at http://supremecourtofindia.nic.in/
 
 Madhukar Hiralal Kania's obituary

1927 births
2016 deaths
Chief justices of India
Scholars from Mumbai
Judges of the Bombay High Court
Chief Justices of the Bombay High Court
20th-century Indian judges
20th-century Indian lawyers

ml:മധുകർ ഹരിലാൽ കനിയ